No Boundaries is an unofficial CD release presenting recordings by the late American singer Eva Cassidy. Released in 2000, it is a collection of studio recordings from 1987 to 1991. The release was not endorsed by the Cassidy family, and was released by Renata Music Company, unlike her other albums, which were released by Blix Street Records. The album contains remixes of 5 tracks from her albums, 4 unreleased originals written by Tony Taylor, and a radio edit of "Emotional Step".

Track listing

"Emotional Step" (Tony Taylor) – 4:50
"The Waiting Is Over" (David Christopher) – 3:26
"You Are" (Taylor) – 4:56
"(You Make Me Feel Like) A Natural Woman" (Gerry Goffin, Carole King, Jerry Wexler) – 3:39
"Little Children" (Christopher, Taylor) – 3:57
"I've Got This Feeling" (Taylor) – 4:38
"When It's Too Late" (Christopher) – 4:23
"On the Inside" (Taylor) – 4:04
"Emotional Step" [Radio Edit] (Taylor) – 4:28
"A Natural Woman (You Make Me Feel Like)" (Goffin, King, Wexler) – 3:33
"Little Children" (Christopher, Taylor) – 3:55

Personnel

 Eva Cassidy – vocals
 David Christopher – acoustic guitar
 Ira Mayfield – guitar
 Tony Taylor – keyboards, background vocals

Production

 Producer: Tony Taylor
 Executive producer: Tony Taylor
 Engineers: Chris Biondo, David Christopher, Tony Taylor
 Mixing: Tony Taylor
 Mastering: Charlie Pilzer
 Sequencing: Tony Taylor
 Arrangers: Tony Taylor, David Christopher
Design: Eileen White
Photography: David Christopher

Charts

Album

References

External links
 Eva Cassidy website

Eva Cassidy albums